Frontier Energy Group, LLC was an oil field well drilling & production service company based in Denver with offices in the various unconventional oil shale plays in the Western United States. The company provided in wellhead and slickline services with petroleum and natural gas companies.

In January 2013, it merged with Canary, LLC.

History
The company traces its history back to 1986 with the opening of Frontier Wellhead & Supply in Watford City, North Dakota.

Major acquisitions
 Frontier Wellhead & Supply Co. (2008)
 Kodiak Stack Testing Company (2009)
 Cable, Incorporated (2010)
 Hanson Hot Oil (2010)
 Luft Machine & Supply Co. (2011)
 Spicer Wireline Inc. (2012)
 Canary Wellhead Equipment (2013) for "less than $100 million"

References

External links
 

Non-renewable resource companies established in 1986
1986 establishments in North Dakota
2013 mergers and acquisitions
Economy of North Dakota